The canton of Seyne is an administrative division in southeastern France. At the French canton reorganisation which came into effect in March 2015, the canton was expanded from 8 to 34 communes:
 
Archail
Auzet
Barles
Bayons
Beaujeu
Bellaffaire
Le Brusquet
Le Caire
Châteaufort
Clamensane
Claret
Curbans
Draix
Faucon-du-Caire
Gigors
La Javie
Melve
Montclar
La Motte-du-Caire
Nibles
Piégut
Prads-Haute-Bléone
Saint-Martin-lès-Seyne
Selonnet
Seyne
Sigoyer
Thèze
Turriers
Valavoire
Valernes
Vaumeilh
Venterol
Verdaches
Le Vernet

Demographics

See also
Cantons of the Alpes-de-Haute-Provence department 
Communes of France

References

Cantons of Alpes-de-Haute-Provence